Jürg Wyttenbach (2 December 1935 – 22 December 2021) was a Swiss composer, pianist, and orchestra conductor.

Life and career
Wyttenbach studied at the University of the Arts Bern under Sándor Veress and subsequently at the Conservatoire de Paris alongside Yvonne Lefébure and Joseph Calvet. As a pianist, he performed with the Dresden Philharmonic, the Southwest German Radio Symphony Orchestra, the Frankfurt Radio Symphony, and the Kraków Philharmonic Orchestra. He also conducted the Ensemble Modern, the Klangforum Wien, the ensemble recherche, the International Society for Contemporary Music, and the Ensemble l'Itinéraire. He taught piano at the City of Basel Music Academy from 1967 to 2003.

He died in Basel on 22 December 2021, at the age of 86.

Works
Exécution ajournée
Lamentoroso
Tarantella
Encore
Harlekinade
Les Divisions
De Metalli les Prophéties de Leonardo da Vinci

References

External Links
 
 
Sound recordings of works of the composer from the archives of Swiss Radio SRG SSR on Neo.Mx3

1935 births
2021 deaths
Swiss classical pianists
Swiss composers
Swiss conductors (music)
People from Bern